The Mangka'ak are an indigenous ethnic group residing in Sabah, eastern Malaysia on the island of Borneo. They primarily reside in the Sandakan, Labuk-Sugut, and Kinabatangan districts in northeastern Sabah. The population of Mangka'ak was estimated at 20,583 in the year 2000. They are a sub-group of the Kadazan-Dusun, and their language (ISO 639-3 dtb) belongs to the Dusunic branch of the Austronesian language family. The language is threatened with extinction, as most of the current generation use standard Malay in everyday speech.

References 

Indigenous peoples of Southeast Asia
Kadazan-Dusun people
Ethnic groups in Sabah